Oleh Handei (born March 5, 1999, in Kyiv, Ukraine) is a Ukrainian short track speed skater. He competed in the 500 metres event at the 2022 Winter Olympics where he did not advance from the heat.

Sporting career
Handei took up the sport in 2009 in his home city Kyiv. Before that, he tried figure skating.

Handei started his international sporting career in late 2016 when he skated at the World Cup. He debuted during that season at the World Junior Championships. He represented Ukraine in different competitions during the next seasons.

Oleh Handei managed to qualify for his first Winter Games in Beijing based on the performances during the 2021–22 World Cup.

Results

Winter Olympics

World Championships

European Championships

Personal life
His two-year-older brother Volodymyr is also a short track speed skater who represented Ukraine at both World and European championships. Oleh and Volodymyr took up short track speed skating almost together in 2009.

Oleh Handei is student at the National University of Physical Education and Sport of Ukraine and studies physical culture.

References

External links
 Handei's profile
 Handei's statistics
 Handei's Facebook profile

1999 births
Living people
Ukrainian male short track speed skaters
Olympic short track speed skaters of Ukraine
Short track speed skaters at the 2022 Winter Olympics
Sportspeople from Kyiv